Diane Ethel McGifford (born March 26, 1945) is a former Manitoba politician, and was a member of cabinet under Premiers Gary Doer and Greg Selinger.

McGifford was born in Manchester, England, and moved to Manitoba at a young age. She was educated at the University of Manitoba, receiving a Bachelor of Arts degree in 1970, a Master of Arts degree in 1974, and a Ph.D. in English in 1979. She subsequently worked as a professor at the University of Saskatchewan, the University of Manitoba and the University of Winnipeg, and has served as a director of the Fort Garry Women's Resource Centre and Kali-Shiva AIDS Services. McGifford has edited Shakti's Words: An Anthology of South Asian Canadian Women's Poetry and The Geography of Voice: Canadian Literature of the South Asian Diaspora.

McGifford was elected to the Legislative Assembly of Manitoba in the provincial election of 1995, defeating incumbent Liberal Norma McCormick by almost one thousand votes in the central Winnipeg riding of Osborne. She was easily re-elected in the 1999 election in the redistributed riding of Lord Roberts.

The New Democratic Party won the election of 1999, and McGifford was appointed to Premier Gary Doer's first cabinet as Minister of Culture, Heritage and Tourism on October 5, 1999.

On January 17, 2001, she was transferred to the Ministry of Advanced Education and Training. On her initial appointment to cabinet, she was also given responsibility for the Status of Women and Seniors, and the administration of the Manitoba Lotteries Corporation Act. She was relieved of the last responsibility on September 25, 2002, and of the first two on November 4, 2003.

In 2003, McGifford supported Bill Blaikie's campaign to become leader of the federal New Democratic Party.

McGifford was easily re-elected in the 2003 provincial election, and again in the 2007 provincial election. She was replaced as Minister of Advanced Education and Literacy by Southdale MLA Erin Selby, in a brief ceremony in March 2011.  McGifford did not stand for election in the 2011 Manitoba general election.

Works
 
 
 
 
 
 
 
 
 
 71759626

References 

1945 births
Living people
Women MLAs in Manitoba
Canadian people of Scottish descent
English emigrants to Canada
New Democratic Party of Manitoba MLAs
Politicians from Manchester
Members of the Executive Council of Manitoba
Politicians from Winnipeg
University of Manitoba alumni
Academic staff of the University of Manitoba
Academic staff of University of Winnipeg
Academic staff of the University of Saskatchewan
Women government ministers of Canada
21st-century Canadian politicians
21st-century Canadian women politicians